The 2015 San Francisco Giants season was the Giants' 133rd year in Major League Baseball, their 58th year in San Francisco since their move from New York following the 1957 season, and their 16th at AT&T Park. The team entered the season as the defending World Series champions and finished in second place in the NL West for the second straight year, but missed the playoffs with a record of 84–78 (.519).

Events
November 24, 2014 – Free agent IF Pablo Sandoval signs a five-year deal with the Boston Red Sox, bringing to an end Sandoval's decorated tenure with the Giants.
December 4, 2014 – The Giants avoid arbitration with IF Travis Ishikawa and C Héctor Sánchez, agreeing to one-year deals worth $1.1 million and $800,000 respectively.
December 19, 2014 – The Giants acquired IF Casey McGehee from the Miami Marlins in exchange for minor-league RHP's Kendry Flores and Luis Castillo.
December 22, 2014 – The Giants re-sign free agent RHP Sergio Romo to a two-year deal worth $15 million.
December 23, 2014 – Free agent RHP Jake Peavy re-signs with the Giants, agreeing to a two-year deal worth $24 million. Peavy receives full no-trade protection.
January 16, 2015 – A couple of hours prior to the deadline for exchanging arbitration figures, the Giants agree to a one-year $2.1 million deal with RHP Yusmeiro Petit to avoid arbitration.
January 19, 2015 – The Giants officially announce the signing of free-agent OF Nori Aoki to a one-year deal with an option for a second year. Aoki's deal is reportedly worth $4 million with another $1.5 million available in incentives. The option for the 2016 season is a team option worth $5.5 million with a $700,000 buyout, that becomes a mutual option if Aoki reaches 550 plate appearances.
January 22, 2015 – Despite arbitration figures being submitted, the Giants agree to a two-year deal with OF Gregor Blanco to avoid the process. Blanco's deal is reportedly worth $3.6 million in the first year, and $3.9 million in the second.
January 23, 2015 – The Giants re-sign RHP Ryan Vogelsong to a one-year deal reported to be worth $4 million plus performance bonuses.
January 27, 2015 – The Giants avoid arbitration with IF Brandon Crawford agreeing to a one-year deal worth $3.175 million, reportedly the midpoint between the two sides arbitration figure submissions.
February 2, 2015 – The Giants agree to a one-year contract with IF Brandon Belt, the deal is reportedly worth $3.6 million. The midpoint between the two sides arbitration submissions was $3.75 million.
February 12, 2015 – The Giants agree to a one-year contract with IF Casey McGehee, the deal is reportedly worth $4.8 million. The midpoint between the two sides arbitration submissions was $4.7 million.
March 5, 2015 – OF Hunter Pence breaks his arm when hit by a pitch during a spring training game at Scottsdale Stadium.
March 31, 2015 – The Giants designate 2010 first-round pick OF Gary Brown for assignment in order to make room for non-roster invitee OF Justin Maxwell. Maxwell, a Giants fan growing up, was told he would make the Giants opening day roster.
April 3, 2015 – Bruce Bochy and Brian Sabean agree to contract extensions with the Giants through at least the 2019 season. Sabean is promoted to Vice-President of Baseball Operations, while Bobby Evans is promoted to General Manager.
April 5, 2015 – The Giants opening day roster is announced with the Giants naming 13 pitchers, and choosing IF Matt Duffy over IF Ehíré Adríanza for the final bench spot. OF Hunter Pence and IF Travis Ishikawa will begin the season on the disabled list.
April 7, 2015 – The day after the Giants open the season with a win against the Arizona Diamondbacks, with RHP Jake Peavy having already been scheduled to miss his first start of the year, RHP Matt Cain is placed on the 15-day disabled list with a flexor tendon strain. The Giants call up RHP Chris Heston to take Cain's place in the rotation.
April 18, 2015 – The Giants lose another starting pitcher when RHP Jake Peavy is placed on the disabled list with a back strain, moving RHP Ryan Vogelsong back from the bullpen into the rotation.
May 16, 2015 – OF Hunter Pence is activated from the disabled list, doubling in his first at-bat and scoring three runs in the game.
May 21, 2015 – The Giants complete a three-game shutout sweep of the Los Angeles Dodgers at AT&T Park, a feat they last managed June 25–27, 2012.
June 8, 2015 – The 2015 Major League Baseball draft takes place with the Giants selecting RHP Phil Bickford with the 18th overall pick.
June 9, 2015 – RHP Chris Heston pitches the 17th no-hitter in Giants history against the New York Mets, making 110 pitches, striking out 11 including three called strikeouts in the 9th inning, with the only baserunners being 3 hit batsmen. Heston also had two hits and drove in two runs in the game. The no-hitter was the third by a Giants rookie and the first by a visiting pitcher at Citi Field. The Giants became the second team in history to throw no-hitters in four consecutive seasons, following the 1962-65 Los Angeles Dodgers.
June 12, 2015 – OF Hunter Pence returns to the disabled list with tendinitis in his left wrist.
June 20, 2015 – OF Nori Aoki is hit by a pitch from Dodgers RHP Carlos Frías. After initially being diagnosed with a contusion, a second X-ray revealed that Aoki had fractured his right fibula and would have to spend two weeks with his leg in a cast before being re-evaluated. Aoki was placed on the 15-day disabled list.
July 2, 2015 – The Giants sign Bahamian IF Lucius Fox with a signing bonus of $6 million. Fox ranked 3rd on MLB.com's top 30 international prospects.
July 3, 2015 – RHP Matt Cain and RHP Jake Peavy return from the disabled list, losing two games of an 0-6 road-trip for the Giants. RHPs Tim Lincecum and Tim Hudson are placed on the disabled list in their places.
July 6, 2015 – The rosters for the 2015 Major League Baseball All-Star Game are announced, with C Buster Posey being named the National League's starter at catcher and to the all-star game for the third time. LHP Madison Bumgarner is named to his third all-star roster, IF Joe Panik and IF Brandon Crawford make the all-star game for the first time.
July 7, 2015 – OF Hunter Pence comes off the disabled list helping the Giants to snap a 7-game losing streak, and to a sweep of the Philadelphia Phillies to leave their record at 46–43 at the All-star break.
July 30, 2015 – The Giants trade two minor leaguers; IF Adam Duvall and RHP Keury Mella to the Cincinnati Reds in exchange for RHP Mike Leake.
August 20, 2015 – On a day when two of the Giants starting outfielders were on the disabled list, the Giants acquire OF Marlon Byrd and cash d from the Cincinnati Reds in exchange for minor league RHP Stephen Johnson.
August 31, 2015 – The Giants acquire OF Alejandro De Aza and cash from the Boston Red Sox in exchange for minor league LHP Luis Ysla.

Season standings

National League West

National League Division and Wild Card Standings

Record vs. opponents

Game log and schedule

All schedule and scores taken from MLB.com.

|- style="text-align:center; style="background-color:#bfb;"
| 1 || April 6 || @ Diamondbacks || 5–4 || Bumgarner (1–0) || Collmenter (0–1) || Casilla (1) || 49,043 || 1–0
|- style="text-align:center; style="background-color:#fbb;"
| 2 || April 7 || @ Diamondbacks || 6–7 || De La Rosa (1–0) || Vogelsong (0–1) || Reed (1) || 22,626 || 1–1
|- style="text-align:center; style="background-color:#bfb;"
| 3 || April 8 || @ Diamondbacks || 5–2 || Heston (1–0) || Hellickson (0–1) || Casilla (2) || 21,642 || 2–1
|- style="text-align:center; style="background-color:#bfb;"
| 4 || April 9 || @ Padres || 1–0 (12) || Kontos (1–0) || Vincent (0–1) || Casilla (3) || 45,150 || 3–1 
|- style="text-align:center; style="background-color:#fbb;"
| 5 || April 10 || @ Padres || 0–1 || Benoit (2–0) || Affeldt (0–1) || Kimbrel (1) || 40,015 || 3–2
|- style="text-align:center; style="background-color:#fbb;"
| 6 || April 11 || @ Padres || 2–10 || Shields (1–0) || Bumgarner (1–1) ||  || 42,823 || 3–3
|- style="text-align:center; style="background-color:#fbb;"
| 7 || April 12 || @ Padres || 4–6 || Ross (1–0) || Peavy (0–1) || Kimbrel (2) || 40,184 || 3–4
|- style="text-align:center; style="background-color:#fbb;"
| 8 || April 13 || Rockies || 0–2 || Butler (1–0) || Heston (1–1) || Betancourt (1) || 42,019 || 3–5
|- style="text-align:center; style="background-color:#fbb;"
| 9 || April 14 || Rockies || 1–4 || Oberg (1–0) || Hudson (0–1) || Ottavino (1) || 41,051 || 3–6
|- style="text-align:center; style="background-color:#fbb;"
| 10 || April 15 || Rockies || 2–4 || Matzek (1–0) || Lincecum (0–1) || Ottavino (2) || 41,188 || 3–7
|- style="text-align:center; style="background-color:#fbb;"
| 11 || April 16 || Diamondbacks || 6–7 (12) || Delgado (1–1) || Romo (0–1) ||  || 41,545 || 3–8
|- style="text-align:center; style="background-color:#fbb;"
| 12 || April 17 || Diamondbacks || 0–9 || Collmenter (1–2) || Peavy (0–2) ||  || 41,550 || 3–9
|- style="text-align:center; style="background-color:#bfb;"
| 13 || April 18 || Diamondbacks || 4–1 || Heston (2–1) || De La Rosa (2–1) || Casilla (4) || 41,756 || 4–9
|- style="text-align:center; style="background-color:#fbb;"
| 14 || April 19 || Diamondbacks || 1–5 || Hellickson (1–2) || Hudson (0–2) ||  || 41,528 || 4–10
|- style="text-align:center; style="background-color:#bfb;"
| 15 || April 21 || Dodgers || 6–2 || Lincecum (1–1) || Anderson (1–1) || Casilla (5) || 41,386 || 5–10
|- style="text-align:center; style="background-color:#bfb;"
| 16 || April 22 || Dodgers || 3–2 || Casilla (1–0) || Hatcher (0–2) ||  || 42,259 || 6–10
|- style="text-align:center; style="background-color:#bfb;"
| 17 || April 23 || Dodgers || 3–2 (10) || Casilla (2–0) || Nicasio (0–1) ||  || 41,240 || 7–10
|- style="text-align:center; style="background-color:#fbb;"
| 18 || April 24 || @ Rockies || 4–6 || Butler (2–1) || Heston (2–2) || Ottavino (3) || 31,453 || 7–11
|- style="text-align:center; style="background-color:#bfb;"
| 19 || April 25 || @ Rockies || 5–4 (11) || Machi (1–0) || Brown (0–1) ||  || 36,474 || 8–11
|- style="text-align:center;  style="text-align:center; background:#bbb"
| – || April 26 || @ Rockies || colspan="6" | Postponed (inclement weather) (Makeup date:May 23)
|- style="text-align:center; style="background-color:#fbb;"
| 20 || April 27 || @ Dodgers || 3–8 || Frías (1–0) || Lincecum (1–2) ||  || 46,704 || 8–12
|- style="text-align:center;  style="background-color:#bfb;"
| 21 || April 28 || @ Dodgers || 2–1 || Bumgarner (2–1) || Kershaw (1–2) || Casilla (6) || 50,161 || 9–12
|- style="text-align:center; style="background-color:#fbb;"
| 22 || April 29 || @ Dodgers || 3–7 || Greinke (4–0) || Vogelsong (0–2) ||  || 53,285 || 9–13
|-

|- style="text-align:center; style="background-color:#bfb;"
| 23 || May 1 || Angels || 3–2 || Casilla (3–0) || Smith (0–1) ||  || 41,507 || 10–13
|- style="text-align:center; style="background-color:#bfb;"
| 24 || May 2 || Angels || 5–4 || Hudson (1–2) || Santiago (2–2) || Casilla (7) || 41,287 || 11–13
|- style="text-align:center; style="background-color:#bfb;"
| 25 || May 3 || Angels || 5–0 || Lincecum (2–2) || Weaver (0–4) ||  || 41,516 || 12–13
|- style="text-align:center; style="background-color:#bfb;"
| 26 || May 4 || Padres || 2–0 || Bumgarner (3–1) || Ross (1–3) || Casilla (8) || 41,278 || 13–13
|- style="text-align:center; style="background-color:#bfb;"
| 27 || May 5 || Padres || 6–0 || Vogelsong (1–2) || Cashner (1–5)   ||  || 41,358 || 14–13
|- style="text-align:center; style="background-color:#fbb;"
| 28 || May 6 || Padres || 1–9 || Kennedy (2–1) || Heston (2–3) ||  || 41,060 || 14–14
|- style="text-align:center; style="background-color:#fbb;"
| 29 || May 7 || Marlins || 2–7 || Haren (4–1) || Hudson (1–3) ||  || 41,367 || 14–15
|- style="text-align:center; style="background-color:#bfb;"
| 30 || May 8 || Marlins || 6–0 || Lincecum (3–2) || Cosart (1–3) || Petit (1) || 41,413 || 15–15
|- style="text-align:center; style="background-color:#fbb;"
| 31 || May 9 || Marlins || 2–6 || Phelps (2–0) || Bumgarner (3–2) ||  || 42,285 || 15–16
|- style="text-align:center; style="background-color:#bfb;"
| 32 || May 10 || Marlins || 3–2 || Casilla (4–0) || Cishek (1–2) ||  || 41,889 || 16–16
|- style="text-align:center; style="background-color:#bfb;"
| 33 || May 12 || @ Astros || 8–1 || Heston (3–3) || McHugh (4–1) ||  || 20,468 || 17–16
|- style="text-align:center; style="background-color:#fbb;"
| 34 || May 13 || @ Astros || 3–4 || Qualls (1–2) || Affeldt (0–2) || Gregerson (8) || 20,725 || 17–17
|- style="text-align:center; style="background-color:#fbb;"
| 35 || May 14 || @ Reds || 3–4 || Díaz (2–0) || Romo (0–2) || Chapman (7) || 21,792 || 17–18
|- style="text-align:center; style="background-color:#bfb;"
| 36 || May 15 || @ Reds || 10–2 || Bumgarner (4–2) || Marquis (3–3) ||  || 39,867 || 18–18
|- style="text-align:center; style="background-color:#bfb;"
| 37 || May 16 || @ Reds || 11–2 || Vogelsong (2–2) || Leake (2–2) ||  || 40,889 || 19–18
|- style="text-align:center; style="background-color:#bfb;"
| 38 || May 17 || @ Reds || 9–8 || Petit (1–0) || DeSclafani (2–4) || Casilla (9) || 39,209 || 20–18
|- style="text-align:center; style="background-color:#bfb;"
| 39 || May 19 || Dodgers || 2–0 || Hudson (2–3) || Frías (3–1) || Casilla (10) || 41,392 || 21–18
|- style="text-align:center; style="background-color:#bfb;"
| 40 || May 20 || Dodgers || 4–0 || Lincecum (4–2) || Anderson (2–2) ||  || 41,920 || 22–18
|- style="text-align:center; style="background-color:#bfb;"
| 41 || May 21 || Dodgers || 4–0 || Bumgarner (5–2) || Kershaw (2–3) ||  || 41,840 || 23–18
|- style="text-align:center; style="background-color:#bfb;"
| 42 || May 22 || @ Rockies || 11–8 || Vogelsong (3–2) || Kendrick (1–6) || Casilla (11) || 31,226 || 24–18
|- style="text-align:center; style="background-color:#bfb;"
| 43 || May 23 || @ Rockies || 10–8 || Heston (4–3) || Lyles (2–5) || Casilla (12) || 32,956 || 25–18
|- style="text-align:center; style="background-color:#fbb;"
| 44 || May 23 || @ Rockies || 3–5 || Hale (1–0) || Petit (1–1) || Axford (6) || 30,180 || 25–19
|- style="text-align:center; style="background-color:#fbb;"
| 45 || May 24 || @ Rockies || 2–11 || Bettis (1–0) || Hudson (2–4) ||  || 34,404 || 25–20
|- style="text-align:center; style="background-color:#bfb;"
| 46 || May 25 || @ Brewers || 8–4 || Lincecum (5–2) || Lohse (3–5) ||  || 41,969 || 26–20
|- style="text-align:center; style="background-color:#bfb;"
| 47 || May 26 || @ Brewers || 6–3 || Bumgarner (6–2) || Garza (2–7) || Casilla (13) || 35,492 || 27–20
|- style="text-align:center; style="background-color:#bfb;"
| 48 || May 27 || @ Brewers || 3–1 || Vogelsong (4–2) || Fiers (1–5) || Casilla (14) || 35,208 || 28–20
|- style="text-align:center; style="background-color:#bfb;"
| 49 || May 28 || Braves || 7–0 || Heston (5–3) || Miller (5–2) ||  || 41,040 || 29–20
|- style="text-align:center; style="background-color:#bfb;"
| 50 || May 29 || Braves || 4–2 || Hudson (3–4) || Foltynewicz (3–2) || Casilla (15) || 41,311 || 30–20
|- style="text-align:center; style="background-color:#fbb;"
| 51 || May 30 || Braves || 0–8 || Pérez (1–0) || Lincecum (5–3) ||  || 42,005 || 30–21
|- style="text-align:center; style="background-color:#fbb;"
| 52 || May 31 || Braves || 5–7 || Masset (1–1) || Casilla (4–1) || Grilli (15) || 41,553 || 30–22
|-

|- style="text-align:center; style="background-color:#fbb;"
| 53 || June 1 || Pirates || 3–4 || Cole (8–2) || Vogelsong (4–3) || Melancon (14) || 41,546 || 30–23
|- style="text-align:center; style="background-color:#fbb;"
| 54 || June 2 || Pirates || 4–7 || Burnett (6–1) || Heston (5–4) || Melancon (15) || 41,913 || 30–24
|- style="text-align:center; style="background-color:#fbb;"
| 55 || June 3 || Pirates || 2–5 || Liriano (3–4) || Hudson (3–5) || Melancon (16) || 41,495 || 30–25
|- style="text-align:center; style="background-color:#bfb;"
| 56 || June 5 || @ Phillies || 5–4 || Lincecum (6–3) || García (2–2) || Casilla (16) || 20,638 || 31–25
|- style="text-align:center; style="background-color:#bfb;"
| 57 || June 6 || @ Phillies || 7–5 || Bumgarner (7–2) || González (2–2) || Casilla (17) || 29,102 || 32–25
|- style="text-align:center; style="background-color:#fbb;"
| 58 || June 7 || @ Phillies || 4–6 || Giles (2–1) || Vogelsong (4–4) || Papelbon (12) || 24,799 || 32–26
|- style="text-align:center; style="background-color:#bfb;"
| 59 || June 9 || @ Mets || 5–0 || Heston (6–4) || Syndergaard (2–4) ||  || 23,155 || 33–26
|- style="text-align:center; style="background-color:#bfb;"
| 60 || June 10 || @ Mets || 8–5 || Hudson (4–5) || Harvey (6–4) || Casilla (18) || 24,436 || 34–26
|- style="text-align:center; style="background-color:#fbb;"
| 61 || June 11 || @ Mets || 4–5 || Familia (2–0) || Romo (0–3) ||  || 25,143 || 34–27
|- style="text-align:center; style="background-color:#fbb;"
| 62 || June 12 || Diamondbacks || 0–1 || Anderson (2–1) || Bumgarner (7–3) || Ziegler (7) || 41,952 || 34–28
|- style="text-align:center; style="background-color:#fbb;"
| 63 || June 13 || Diamondbacks || 2–4 || Webster (1–0) || Vogelsong (4–5) || Ziegler (8) || 42,006 || 34–29
|- style="text-align:center; style="background-color:#fbb;"
| 64 || June 14 || Diamondbacks || 0–4 || De La Rosa (5–3) || Heston (6–5) || Hudson (1) || 41,310 || 34–30
|- style="text-align:center; style="background-color:#fbb;"
| 65 || June 15 || Mariners || 1–5 || Walker (4–6) || Hudson (4–6) ||  || 42,099 || 34–31
|- style="text-align:center; style="background-color:#bfb;"
| 66 || June 16 || Mariners || 6–2 || Lincecum (7–3) || Happ (3–3) ||  || 41,267 || 35–31
|- style="text-align:center; style="background-color:#fbb;"
| 67 || June 17 || @ Mariners || 0–2 || Hernández (10–3) || Bumgarner (7–4) || Smith (3) || 38,844 || 35–32
|- style="text-align:center; style="background-color:#bfb;"
| 68 || June 18 || @ Mariners || 7–0 || Vogelsong (5–5) || Montgomery (1–2) ||  || 34,354 || 36–32
|- style="text-align:center; style="background-color:#bfb;"
| 69 || June 19 || @ Dodgers || 9–5 || Heston (7–5) || Bolsinger (4–2) || Casilla (19) || 52,503 || 37–32
|- style="text-align:center; style="background-color:#bfb;"
| 70 || June 20 || @ Dodgers || 6–2 || Hudson (5–6) || Frías (4–5) ||  || 53,123 || 38–32
|- style="text-align:center; style="background-color:#fbb;"
| 71 || June 21 || @ Dodgers || 2–10 || Anderson (3–4) || Lincecum (7–4) ||  || 53,509 || 38–33
|- style="text-align:center; style="background-color:#fbb;"
| 72 || June 23 || Padres || 2–3 (11) || Maurer (5–0) || Strickland (0–1) || Kimbrel (18) || 42,067 || 38–34
|- style="text-align:center; style="background-color:#bfb;"
| 73 || June 24 || Padres || 6–0 || Vogelsong (6–5) || Kennedy (4–6) ||  || 41,744 || 39–34
|- style="text-align:center; style="background-color:#bfb;"
| 74 || June 25 || Padres || 13–8 || Heston (8–5) || Shields (7–2) ||  || 41,533 || 40–34
|- style="text-align:center; style="background-color:#fbb;"
| 75 || June 26 || Rockies || 6–8 || Bettis (4–2) || Hudson (5–7) ||  || 41,887 || 40–35
|- style="text-align:center; style="background-color:#bfb;"
| 76 || June 27 || Rockies || 7–5 || Kontos (2–0) || Betancourt (2-3) || Casilla (20) || 41,746 || 41–35
|- style="text-align:center; style="background-color:#bfb;"
| 77 || June 28 || Rockies || 6–3 || Bumgarner (8–4) || Kendrick (3–10)  ||  || 41,795 || 42–35
|- style="text-align:center; style="background-color:#fbb;"
| 78 || June 30 || @ Marlins || 3–5 || Latos (3–5) || Vogelsong (6–6) || Ramos (11) || 19,711 || 42–36
|-

|- style="text-align:center; style="background-color:#fbb;"
| 79 || July 1 || @ Marlins || 5–6 || Cishek (2–5) || Casilla (4–2) ||  || 19,341 || 42–37
|- style="text-align:center; style="background-color:#fbb;"
| 80 || July 2 || @ Marlins || 4–5 || Fernández (1–0) || Cain (0–1) || Ramos (12) || 32,598 || 42–38
|- style="text-align:center; style="background-color:#fbb;"
| 81 || July 3 || @ Nationals || 1–2 || Gonzalez (6–4) || Peavy (0–3) || Storen (24) || 41,693 || 42–39
|- style="text-align:center; style="background-color:#fbb;"
| 82 || July 4 || @ Nationals || 3–9 || Roark (4–3) || Bumgarner (8–5) ||  || 40,029 || 42–40
|- style="text-align:center; style="background-color:#fbb;"
| 83 || July 5 || @ Nationals || 1–3 || Zimmermann (7–5) || Kontos (2–1) || Storen (25) || 33,157 || 42–41
|- style="text-align:center; style="background-color:#fbb;"
| 84 || July 6 || Mets || 0–3 || Niese (4–8) || Romo (0–4) || Familia (23) || 42,247 || 42–42
|- style="text-align:center; style="background-color:#bfb;"
| 85 || July 7 || Mets || 3–0 || Cain (1–1) || Colón (9–7) || Casilla (21) || 42,164 || 43–42
|- style="text-align:center" style="background-color:#fbb;"
| 86 || July 8 || Mets || 1–4 || deGrom (9–6) || Peavy (0–4) || Familia (24) || 41,914 || 43–43
|- style="text-align:center" style="background-color:#bfb;"
| 87 || July 10 || Phillies || 15–2 || Bumgarner (9–5) || Hamels (5–7) ||  || 41,895 || 44–43
|- style="text-align:center" style="background-color:#bfb;"
| 88 || July 11 || Phillies || 8–5 || Osich (1–0) || García (3–4) || Casilla (22) || 41,980 || 45–43
|- style="text-align:center" style="background-color:#bfb;"
| 89 || July 12 || Phillies || 4–2 || Heston (9–5) || Billingsley (1–3) || Casilla (23) || 42,387 || 46–43
|- style="text-align:center" style="background-color:#bfb;"
| 90 || July 17 || @ Diamondbacks || 6–5 (12) || Vogelsong (7–6) || Delgado (4–3) ||  || 26,922 || 47–43
|- style="text-align:center" style="background-color:#bfb;"
| 91 || July 18 || @ Diamondbacks || 8–4 || Peavy (1–4) || Anderson (4–4) || Romo (1) || 37,609 || 48–43
|- style="text-align:center" style="background-color:#bfb;"
| 92 || July 19 || @ Diamondbacks || 2–1 || Bumgarner (10–5) || Corbin (1–2) || Casilla (24) || 27,173 || 49–43
|- style="text-align:center" style="background-color:#fbb;"
| 93 || July 20 || @ Padres || 2–4 || Kennedy (5–9) || Hudson (5–8) || Kimbrel (26) || 35,033 || 49–44
|- style="text-align:center" style="background-color:#bfb;"
| 94 || July 21 || @ Padres || 9–3 || Heston (10–5) || Despaigne (3–7) ||  || 35,596 || 50–44
|- style="text-align:center" style="background-color:#bfb;"
| 95 || July 22 || @ Padres || 7–1 || Cain (2–1) || Maurer (6–3) ||  || 38,435 || 51–44
|- style="text-align:center" style="background-color:#bfb;"
| 96 || July 24 || Athletics || 9–3 || Peavy (2–4) || Chavez (5–10) ||  || 42,128 || 52–44
|- style="text-align:center" style="background-color:#bfb;"
| 97 || July 25 || Athletics || 2–1 || Bumgarner (11–5) || Bassitt (0–3) || Casilla (25) || 42,162 || 53–44
|- style="text-align:center" style="background-color:#bfb;"
| 98 || July 26 || Athletics || 4–3 || Hudson (6–8) || Graveman (6–7) || Casilla (26) || 42,034 || 54–44
|- style="text-align:center" style="background-color:#bfb;"
| 99 || July 27 || Brewers || 4–2 || Heston (11–5) || Lohse (5–12) || Romo (2) || 41,988 || 55–44
|- style="text-align:center" style="background-color:#fbb;"
| 100 || July 28 || Brewers || 2–5 || Peralta (2–5) || Cain (2–2) || Rodríguez (23) || 42,743 || 55–45
|- style="text-align:center" style="background-color:#bfb;"
| 101 || July 29 || Brewers || 5–0 || Strickland (1–1) || Fiers (5–9) ||  || 42,352 || 56–45
|- style="text-align:center" style="background-color:#fbb;"
| 102 || July 31 || @ Rangers || 3–6 || Martinez (6–6) || Bumgarner (11–6) ||  || 30,674 || 56–46
|-

|- style="text-align:center" style="background-color:#bfb;"
| 103 || August 1 || @ Rangers || 9–7 (11) || Strickland (2–1) || Dyson (0–1) || Casilla (27) || 41,114 || 57–46
|- style="text-align:center" style="background-color:#fbb;"
| 104 || August 2 || @ Rangers || 1–2 || Pérez (1–2) || Leake (9–6) || Dyson (1) || 22,234 || 57–47
|- style="text-align:center" style="background-color:#fbb;"
| 105 || August 3 || @ Braves || 8–9 (12) || Vizcaíno (2–0) || Vogelsong (7–7) ||  || 23,428 || 57–48
|- style="text-align:center" style="background-color:#bfb;"
| 106 || August 4 || @ Braves || 8–3 || Affeldt (1–2) || Aardsma (0–1) ||  || 18,411 || 58–48
|- style="text-align:center" style="background-color:#bfb;"
| 107 || August 5 || @ Braves || 6–1 || Bumgarner (12–6) || Pérez (4–2) ||  || 17,444 || 59–48
|- style="text-align:center" style="background-color:#fbb;"
| 108 || August 6 || @ Cubs || 4–5 || Grimm (2–3) || Heston (11–6) || Rondón (17) || 41,242 || 59–49
|- style="text-align:center" style="background-color:#fbb;"
| 109 || August 7 || @ Cubs || 3–7 || Lester (7–8) || Vogelsong (7–8) || Rondón (18) || 41,311 || 59–50
|- style="text-align:center" style="background-color:#fbb;"
| 110 || August 8 || @ Cubs || 6–8 || Hendricks (6–5) || Cain (2–3) || Grimm (3) || 41,305 || 59–51
|- style="text-align:center" style="background-color:#fbb;"
| 111 || August 9 || @ Cubs || 0–2 || Arrieta (13–6) || Peavy (2–5) || Rondón (19) || 39,939 || 59–52
|- style="text-align:center" style="background-color:#bfb;"
| 112 || August 11 || Astros || 3–1 || Bumgarner (13–6) || Kazmir (6–7) ||  || 42,569 || 60–52
|- style="text-align:center" style="background-color:#fbb;"
| 113 || August 12 || Astros || 0–2 || Feldman (5–5) || Heston (11–7) || Gregerson (23) || 41,967 || 60–53
|- style="text-align:center" style="background-color:#bfb;"
| 114 || August 13 || Nationals || 3–1 || Vogelsong (8–8) || Strasburg (6–6) || Casilla (28) || 42,109 || 61–53
|- style="text-align:center" style="background-color:#bfb;"
| 115 || August 14 || Nationals || 8–5 || Affeldt (2–2) || Scherzer (11–9) ||  || 41,675 || 62–53
|- style="text-align:center" style="background-color:#bfb;"
| 116 || August 15 || Nationals || 12–6 || Peavy (3–5) || Gonzalez (9–5) ||  || 41,916 || 63–53
|- style="text-align:center" style="background-color:#bfb;"
| 117 || August 16 || Nationals || 5–0 || Bumgarner (14–6) || Ross (3–5) ||  || 41,904 || 64–53
|- style="text-align:center" style="background-color:#fbb;"
| 118 || August 17 || @ Cardinals || 1–2 || Siegrist (4–0) || Strickland (2–2) || Rosenthal (37) || 40,088 || 64–54
|- style="text-align:center" style="background-color:#bfb;"
| 119 || August 18 || @ Cardinals || 2–0 || Vogelsong (9–8) || Lynn (9–8) || Casilla (29) || 40,297 || 65–54
|- style="text-align:center" style="background-color:#fbb;"
| 120 || August 19 || @ Cardinals || 3–4 || Siegrist (5–0) || Strickland (2–3) || Rosenthal (38) || 40,278 || 65–55
|- style="text-align:center" style="background-color:#fbb;"
| 121 || August 20 || @ Pirates || 0–4 || Morton (8–4) || Peavy (3–6) ||  || 36,671 || 65–56
|- style="text-align:center" style="background-color:#bfb;"
| 122 || August 21 || @ Pirates || 6–4 || Bumgarner (15–6) || Locke (6–8) || Casilla (30) || 37,692 || 66–56
|- style="text-align:center" style="background-color:#fbb;"
| 123 || August 22 || @ Pirates || 2–3 || Melancon (3–1) || Kontos (2–2) ||  || 38,259 || 66–57
|- style="text-align:center" style="background-color:#fbb;"
| 124 || August 23 || @ Pirates || 2–5 || Liriano (9–6) || Vogelsong (9–9) || Rosenthal (39) || 31,364 || 66–58
|- style="text-align:center" style="background-color:#fbb;"
| 125 || August 25 || Cubs || 5–8 || Arrieta (16–6) || Cain (2–4) || Rondón (24) || 41,595 || 66–59
|- style="text-align:center" style="background-color:#bfb;"
| 126 || August 26 || Cubs || 4–2 || Peavy (4–6) || Hendricks (6–6) || Casilla (31) || 41,640 || 67–59
|- style="text-align:center" style="background-color:#bfb;"
| 127 || August 27 || Cubs || 9–1 || Bumgarner (16–6) || Haren (8–9) ||  || 41,847 || 68–59
|- style="text-align:center" style="background-color:#bfb;"
| 128 || August 28 || Cardinals || 5–4 || López (1–0) || Siegrist (5–1) ||  || 41,577 || 69–59
|- style="text-align:center" style="background-color:#fbb;"
| 129 || August 29 || Cardinals || 0–6 || Lynn (11–8) || Vogelsong (9–10) ||  || 41,796 || 69–60
|- style="text-align:center" style="background-color:#fbb;"
| 130 || August 30 || Cardinals || 5–7 || García (7–4) || Heston (11–8) || Siegrist (6) || 41,770 || 69–61
|- style="text-align:center" style="background-color:#fbb;"
| 131 || August 31 || @ Dodgers || 4–5 (14) || Hatcher (2–5) || Broadway (0–1) ||  || 40,851 || 69–62
|-

|- style="text-align:center" style="background-color:#fbb;"
| 132 || September 1 || @ Dodgers || 1–2 || Greinke (15–3) || Bumgarner (16–7) || Jansen (28) || 48,060 || 69–63
|- style="text-align:center" style="background-color:#fbb;"
| 133 || September 2 || @ Dodgers || 1–2 || Kershaw (12–6) || Leake (9–7) ||  || 41,648 || 69–64
|- style="text-align:center" style="background-color:#fbb;"
| 134 || September 3 || @ Rockies || 3–11 || Rusin (5–7) || Vogelsong (9–11) ||  || 25,863 || 69–65
|- style="text-align:center" style="background-color:#fbb;"
| 135 || September 4 || @ Rockies || 1–2 || de la Rosa (9–6) || Heston (11–9) || Axford (19) || 29,196 || 69–66
|- style="text-align:center" style="background-color:#bfb;"
| 136 || September 5 || @ Rockies || 7–3 || Peavy (5–6) || Bettis (6–5) ||  || 37,672 || 70–66
|- style="text-align:center" style="background-color:#bfb;"
| 137 || September 6 || @ Rockies || 7–4 || Bumgarner (17–7) || Flande (3–2) || Casilla (32) || 36,649 || 71–66
|- style="text-align:center" style="background-color:#fbb;"
| 138 || September 7 || @ Diamondbacks || 1–6 || Corbin (5–3) || Leake (9–8) ||  || 28,078 || 71–67
|- style="text-align:center" style="background-color:#bfb;"
| 139 || September 8 || @ Diamondbacks || 6–2 || Hudson (7–8) || Anderson (6–6) ||  || 18,683 || 72–67
|- style="text-align:center" style="background-color:#fbb;"
| 140 || September 9 || @ Diamondbacks || 1–2 || Godley (5–1) || Heston (11–10) || Ziegler (25) || 20,576 || 72–68
|- style="text-align:center" style="background-color:#bfb;"
| 141 || September 11 || Padres || 9–1 || Peavy (6–6) || Cashner (5–15) ||  || 41,621 || 73–68
|- style="text-align:center" style="background-color:#bfb;"
| 142 || September 12 || Padres || 8–0 || Bumgarner (18–7) || Kennedy (8–14) ||  || 41,564 || 74–68
|- style="text-align:center" style="background-color:#bfb;"
| 143 || September 13 || Padres || 10–3 || Leake (10–8) || Despaigne (5–9) ||  || 41,397 || 75–68
|- style="text-align:center" style="background-color:#bfb;"
| 144 || September 14 || Reds || 5–3 || Kontos (3–2) || Sampson (2–5) || Casilla (33) || 41,025 || 76–68
|- style="text-align:center" style="background-color:#fbb;"
| 145 || September 15 || Reds || 8–9 (10) || Chapman (4–4) || Romo (0–5) || Díaz (1) || 41,044 || 76–69
|- style="text-align:center" style="background-color:#bfb;"
| 146 || September 16 || Reds || 5–3 || Peavy (7–6) || Lorenzen (4–9) || Casilla (34) || 41,383 || 77–69
|- style="text-align:center" style="background-color:#fbb;"
| 147 || September 18 || Diamondbacks || 0–2 || De La Rosa (13–8) || Bumgarner (18–8) || Ziegler (27) || 41,346 || 77–70
|- style="text-align:center" style="background-color:#fbb;"
| 148 || September 19 || Diamondbacks || 0–6 || Corbin (6–4) || Leake (10–9) ||  || 41,206 || 77–71
|- style="text-align:center" style="background-color:#bfb;"
| 149 || September 20 || Diamondbacks || 5–1 || Hudson (8–8) || Hellickson (9–10) ||  || 41,390 || 78–71
|- style="text-align:center" style="background-color:#bfb;"
| 150 || September 22 || @ Padres || 4–2 || Kontos (4–2) || Ross (10–11) || Casilla (35) || 25,043 || 79–71
|- style="text-align:center" style="background-color:#fbb;"
| 151 || September 23 || @ Padres || 4–5 || Kimbrel (3–2) || Kontos (4–3) ||  || 23,556 || 79–72
|- style="text-align:center" style="background-color:#fbb;"
| 152 || September 24 || @ Padres || 4–5 || Kimbrel (4–2) || Broadway (0–2) ||  || 31,137 || 79–73
|- style="text-align:center" style="background-color:#fbb;"
| 153 || September 25 || @ Athletics || 4–5 || Gray (14–7) || Leake (10–10) || Doolittle (2) || 36,067 || 79–74
|- style="text-align:center" style="background-color:#bfb;"
| 154 || September 26 || @ Athletics || 14–10 || Osich (2–0) || Dull (0–1) || Casilla (36) || 36,067 || 80–74
|- style="text-align:center" style="background-color:#bfb;"
| 155 || September 27 || @ Athletics || 5–4 || Heston (12–10) || Nolin (1–2) || Casilla (37) || 36,067 || 81–74
|- style="text-align:center" style="background-color:#bfb;"
| 155 || September 28 || Dodgers || 3–2 (12) || Strickland (3–3) || García (3–5) ||  || 41,341 || 82–74
|- style="text-align:center" style="background-color:#fbb;"
| 157 || September 29 || Dodgers || 0–8 || Kershaw (16–7) || Bumgarner (18–9) ||  || 41,862 || 82–75
|- style="text-align:center" style="background-color:#bfb;"
| 158 || September 30 || Dodgers || 5–0 || Leake (11–10) || Bolsinger (6–6) ||  || 41,112 || 83–75
|-

|- style="text-align:center" style="background-color:#fbb;"
| 159 || October 1 || Dodgers || 2–3 || Anderson (10–9) || Hudson (8–9) || Jansen (35) || 41,027 || 83–76
|- style="text-align:center" style="background-color:#fbb;"
| 160 || October 2 || Rockies || 3–9 || Kendrick (7–13) || Heston (12–11) ||  || 41,505 || 83–77
|- style="text-align:center" style="background-color:#bfb;"
| 161 || October 3 || Rockies || 3–2 || Peavy (8–6) || Rusin (6–10) || Casilla (38) || 41,398 || 84–77
|- style="text-align:center" style="background-color:#fbb;"
| 162 || October 4 || Rockies || 3–7 || Brothers (1–0) || Kontos (4–4) ||  || 41,399 || 84–78
|-

Roster

Statistics
Through October 4, 2015

Batting
Note: G = Games played; AB = At bats; R = Runs scored; H = Hits; 2B = Doubles; 3B = Triples; HR = Home runs; RBI = Runs batted in; BB = Base on balls; SO = Strikeouts; AVG = Batting average; SB = Stolen bases

Pitching
Note: W = Wins; L = Losses; ERA = Earned run average; G = Games pitched; GS = Games started; SV = Saves; IP = Innings pitched; H = Hits allowed; R = Runs allowed; ER = Earned runs allowed; HR = Home runs allowed; BB = Walks allowed; K = Strikeouts

Farm system

LEAGUE CHAMPIONS: DSL Giants

Notes

References

External links

 2015 San Francisco Giants Schedule and Statistics at MLB.com
2015 San Francisco Giants season at Baseball Reference
2015 Media Guide: San Francisco Giants

San Francisco Giants seasons
San Francisco Giants
San Francisco Giants
San Francisco Giants